La Toya Yvonne Jackson (born May 29, 1956) is an American singer and television personality. The fifth child and middle daughter of the Jackson family, Jackson first gained recognition on the family's variety television series, The Jacksons, on CBS between 1976 and 1977. Thereafter, she saw success as a solo recording artist under multiple record labels in the 1980s and 1990s, including Polydor, Sony Music and RCA, where she released nine studio albums over the course of 15 years.  Her most successful releases in the United States were her self-titled debut album (1980) and the 1984 single "Heart Don't Lie". Jackson's other songs include "If You Feel the Funk", "Bet'cha Gonna Need My Lovin'", "Hot Potato", "You're Gonna Get Rocked!", and "Sexbox". Another one of Jackson's songs, "Just Say No" from her fifth album was composed for US first lady Nancy Reagan and Reagan administration’s anti-drug campaign.

She is a two time New York Times best selling author. Jackson posed for Playboy magazine in 1989 and again in 1991 to promote her New York Times Best Seller La Toya: Growing Up in the Jackson Family. In 1992, Jackson signed a contract with the Moulin Rouge to star in the successful Paris revue, Formidable. 
Despite subsequent musical success, Jackson's recording career began its decline in the 1990s as a result of her controversial marriage to entertainment manager Jack Gordon, whom she divorced in 1997. After a period of public seclusion, she returned to the music industry in 2004 with the singles "Just Wanna Dance", "Home", and "Free the World", which saw success on the Hot Dance Club Play chart in the United States. In 2011, she was a contestant on the fourth installment of The Celebrity Apprentice and released an extended play, Starting Over, which is her most recent release to date, called, as well, as her best-selling autobiography.

From 2013 to 2014, Jackson appeared in her own reality television series on the Oprah Winfrey Network, Life with La Toya, which aired for two seasons.

Life and career

1956–1979: Early life and The Jacksons
Born on her sister Rebbie's 6th birthday on May 29, 1956 at St Mary's Mercy Hospital in Gary, Indiana, La Toya Jackson is the fifth of ten children born to Joe and Katherine Jackson and the middle female child between Rebbie and Janet. Growing up, La Toya tended to be shy. After her mother became a member of the Jehovah's Witnesses in 1966, La Toya, along with the rest of her siblings followed. She would spend some of her time alongside her mother preaching door-to-door. "Every morning, Michael and I witnessed, knocking on doors around Los Angeles, spreading the word of Jehovah." By 1974, at seventeen, La Toya joined her brothers in the spotlight with a tap dancing routine when her father arranged for them to perform shows in Las Vegas, among other cities. La Toya attended the Cal-Prep school in Encino, Los Angeles, CA and graduated that year. Jackson aspired to be an attorney specializing in business law. She attended college for a short time before her father insisted that she pursue a career in show business like the rest of the family.

In 1976 and 1977, La Toya and her sisters Rebbie and Janet appeared in all twelve episodes of The Jacksons—a CBS-TV variety program, with their brothers Jackie, Tito, Marlon, Michael, and Randy. Along with their brothers (minus Jermaine, who stayed at Motown and left the family group when his brothers moved to Epic Records), La Toya and her sisters sang, danced, and performed skits. In 1977 during the filming of The Wiz, La Toya traveled with her brother Michael (who was cast as the Scarecrow), to New York. Sharing an apartment, it was the first time either of them had lived elsewhere as adults. Close siblings, Michael and La Toya, would not move out of the family's Encino, Los Angeles, California home until they were 29 and 31 respectively. Her dates during this period included Diana Ross' brother Chico and a young David Gest. Jackson also dated Bobby DeBarge and was the inspiration for Switch's 1979 hit "I Call Your Name".

Under Joe Jackson's tutelage Rebbie, La Toya and Janet formed a short-lived musical group. However, they never performed live and soon separated because of creative differences about the act's future direction. Consequently, no related material was ever released by the trio. The next year, La Toya began work on her first solo album.

1980–1983: Beginning of solo career
In 1980, Jackson released her self-titled debut album. In order to distinguish herself from her famous brothers, The Jacksons, La Toya only wanted her first name on the album. "I begged just to have it 'La Toya'. But my father said, 'It's your last name. You got to use it.' But I wanted to see what I could do as an individual." The first single "If You Feel the Funk", became a modest hit, climbing into the Top 40 of the US R&B chart. Her second single, "Night Time Lover", was produced by younger brother Michael, who provided backing vocals and co-wrote the song with La Toya. In turn, she provided the opening scream on her brothers', The Jacksons, 1980 hit, "This Place Hotel" as well as backing vocals on brother Michael's 1983 solo hit "P.Y.T. (Pretty Young Thing)".

The La Toya Jackson album peaked at #116 on the US Billboard 200, #26 on the Billboard R&B album chart, and #178 on the UK Top 200, making it her highest placing album.

In 1981, Jackson released a follow-up album, My Special Love, which generated two singles, "Stay the Night" and "I Don't Want You to Go".

1984–1987: Heart Don't Lie and international success
1984 saw the release of Jackson's critically acclaimed album Heart Don't Lie. Jackson scored her biggest Billboard Hot 100 hit with the title track, which peaked at number 56. Other singles from this album were "Bet'cha Gonna Need My Lovin'", "Hot Potato", and a cover of Prince's "Private Joy." Jackson and Amir Bayyan co-wrote "Reggae Nights" for Heart Don't Lie but the track did not make the cut. Jimmy Cliff's recording of the song was a hit and was nominated for a Grammy. Cliff commissioned Jackson to write two more songs: "Brown Eyes" and "American Sweet."

In 1984, Jackson capitalized on her rising popularity by licensing her name to a fashion line; "David Laurenz for La Toya." According to her three-year contract with the suede and leather-maker Jackson agreed to only wear David Laurenz items during her public appearances. Apparel in the collection included Jackson's signature leather headbands. Jackson starred in television and print advertisements for Nikon cameras and the following year she became the spokesmodel for cosmetics firm Mahogany Image and launched her own eponymous fragrance, La Toya.

In 1985, Jackson participated on the single "We Are the World", an appeal for famine relief in Ethiopia. That same year Jackson featured in anti-drug music video "Stop the Madness".

Her 1985 single "Baby Sister" was a notable success, as it received one of five Outstanding Song Awards at the sixteenth annual World Popular Song Festival in Japan. "Baby Sister" was included on the 1986 album Imagination, released just before Jackson's record label, Private-I, went bankrupt resulting in poor promotion. Jackson went on to record two duets; "Oops, Oh No!" with Cerrone, and "Yes, I'm Ready" with artist Jed. In 1987 Jackson was featured as a special guest at Minako Honda's DISPA (Disco Party) concert, joining in for the song, "Funkytown".

1988–1989: Departure from the Jackson family and Playboy
In 1987, Jack Gordon was hired to co-manage La Toya by her father, Joseph. He later took over her management completely. Under Gordon's management, Jackson's public image became increasingly sexualized. Katherine Jackson recalled her shock seeing La Toya dance in a suggestive manner in 1988 for the first time in her autobiography My Family, The Jacksons: "she'd been so conservative that she'd once dropped a friend who had begun wearing low-cut tops and skirts with slits in them." Katherine believed that Gordon was distancing La Toya from her family so he could "become the dominating influence in her life." Around this time Jackson was disfellowshipped by the Jehovah's Witnesses. Defying her father, Jackson made a stormy exit from the family's Encino compound to take up residence in New York City. In late 1988, Jackson released the album La Toya, which featured the singles "You're Gonna Get Rocked!" and "(Ain't Nobody Loves You) Like I Do". The album also included a track titled "Just Say No", which was written for the Reagan administration's anti-drug campaign. The album included four tracks produced by Full Force, and three by Stock Aitken Waterman. The album was the first one Jackson released after changing her management.

In March 1989, Jackson posed topless for Playboy magazine. Jackson saw the pictorial as a declaration of independence from her conservative upbringing and "to show my parents they couldn't dictate to me any more—that I control my life." She posed again in Playboy in November 1991 to promote her autobiography and subsequently acted in a 1994 video for the magazine, becoming one of the first celebrities to have a Playboy video released. She later said that she initially refused to pose for the second spread and for the video; however, Gordon beat her into submission.

In 1989, Jackson began recording her sixth album Bad Girl. That year Jackson staged a live pay-per-view concert, A Sizzling Spectacular!, from Bally's theatre in Reno. Jackson's set list included songs from La Toya and Bad Girl. The show featured special guest star Edgar Winter.

1989–1996: Public notoriety, abuse and exile from the Jackson family
On September 5, 1989, after her Sizzling Spectacular concert in Nevada, Gordon and Jackson were married. Jackson later claimed she had been forcibly married, with Gordon claiming it was for her own protection against kidnapping by her family. La Toya Jackson states that this was both unplanned and against her wishes. According to Jackson, "I told him, 'No way, Jack! I can't marry you. You know what marriage means to me. I've never been in love; I don't even date... It's not right. I don't love you. I don't have feelings for you.'" Jackson told Ebony magazine the marriage was "strictly in name only. It has never been consummated." Six months into the marriage, Jackson asked Gordon for an annulment when in Rome, Italy. In response, Gordon repeatedly bashed her head against the corner of the hotel room table saying that he would never let her go. Paparazzi subsequently photographed Jackson with black eyes, which Gordon claimed were caused by an intruder. From this point forward, Jackson lost all contact with her family and wrote an autobiography, La Toya: Growing Up in the Jackson Family, which accused her father of physical abuse.
 
For roughly the next decade Gordon controlled Jackson with threats, lies, and routine domestic violence. According to Jackson, "When he hit me, the first time I was in shock, I just recalled my ear ringing, just ringing so hard." Gordon confiscated Jackson's passport, transferred her bank accounts into his name, hired bodyguards to watch La Toya constantly and banned her from speaking to or seeing her family, monitoring her every phone call. La Toya's father Joseph stated in his book The Jacksons that he believed Gordon brainwashed La Toya and made her fearful of her own family. Katherine also believed that La Toya had been brainwashed while Gordon claimed that Katherine had tried to kill her daughter. Sister Janet concurred with her parents saying at the time, "I think this guy who is with her has brainwashed her and made her like this... He keeps her away from the family, and now he's brainwashed her so much she keeps herself away from us."

In 1990, Jackson participated in the Sanremo Music Festival, entering "You and Me" an English-language version of "Verso l'ignoto" by siblings Marcella and Gianni Bella. While "You and Me" did not win Best Song, it entered Italy's hit parade, peaking at number twenty-eight. That year Jackson signed on with German-based BCM Records and released the single "Why Don't You Want My Love?" Jackson recorded other material with BCM, but the label went bankrupt and album plans were scrapped. Jackson signed with Dino Records quickly thereafter. 1991 saw the release of No Relations, an album with strong house and funk influences. This album featured Jackson's top twenty-five Netherlands hit "Sexbox".

In 1992, Jackson signed a contract with the Moulin Rouge in Paris to star in her own revue, Formidable. Jackson was to perform two shows a night, six nights a week. Jackson was the highest-paid performer in the cabaret's history, earning a reported $5 million. Though Formidable was successful, selling out on most nights, Jackson departed half-way into her year-long contract owing the nightclub $550,000 in damages.

In October 1992, while taping an Exotic Club Tour in Minneapolis Jackson approached sister Janet Jackson, also in town recording her fifth studio album with Jimmy Jam and Terry Lewis, to ask for help in escaping Gordon. Janet struck La Toya, accusing her elder sister of recording their conversation.

In 1993 in their New York home, Gordon beat Jackson repeatedly with a heavy brass dining room chair, leaving Jackson with black eyes, swollen lip and chin "the size of a clenched fist", cuts requiring 12 mouth stitches and contusions on her face, arms, legs and back. Jackson lost consciousness during the beating, leading Gordon to believe she was dead. She recalled, "He called his friends and said, 'She's dead. I killed her,' because I was lying in a puddle of blood and I was out." Gordon was arrested but then released, claiming he beat Jackson in self-defense.
In December 1993, Gordon hastily arranged a press conference in Tel Aviv, where he had Jackson read a statement claiming to believe the sex abuse allegation against her younger brother Michael might be true. This was an abrupt reversal of her previous defense of Michael against the charges. Gordon claimed La Toya had proof which she was prepared to disclose for a fee of $500,000. A bidding war between US and UK tabloids began, but fell through when they realized that her revelations were not what she had claimed them to be.  According to La Toya, Gordon threatened to have siblings Michael and Janet killed if she didn't follow his orders. In 1993, Jackson claimed her father Joe Jackson sexually abused her as a child.

Under Gordon's management, Jackson's career declined with his booking of disreputable jobs such as spokesperson for the Psychic Friends Network. Because of Gordon's steady stream of publicity stunts and her media portrayal as the Jackson family "black sheep" La Toya had become a hate figure of sorts. By the mid-1990s Jackson's finances were in disarray and she was forced to file for bankruptcy in order to stave off claims of $550,000 in damages to the Moulin Rouge for ending her contract early. In 1993 Jackson held a concert at Poland's Sopot International Song Festival and released a step aerobics exercise video, Step-Up Workout. In 1994, Jackson again worked for Playboy Entertainment, becoming one of the first celebrities to have a Celebrity Centerfold video. Playboy Celebrity Centerfold: La Toya Jackson was released in the first quarter of 1994 and sold roughly 50,000 copies. Jackson later released two albums, one of country music, From Nashville to You, and another of Motown hits, Stop in the Name of Love, in the mid-1990s.

1996–2002: Escape and seclusion

When Jackson became aware that Gordon was planning to feature her in a pornographic film she decided she'd had enough. Jackson phoned brother Randy who flew to New York to help her escape while Gordon was out. Only days later, La Toya filed for divorce in Las Vegas and sued Gordon in civil court for years of abuse under the Violence Against Women Act. She changed her name from La Toya Jackson-Gordon to La Toya Jackson, thus dropping use of her former middle name Yvonne. La Toya Jackson ended her estrangement with the entire Jackson family and returned home to Hayvenhurst. Jackson forgave her parents for her stifled upbringing reasoning, "I've come to realize that as we get older, we grow and learn a lot more. And I think that my father and my mother, they raised children the best way they know how." According to La Toya, Michael knew that she was forced to attack him in the press against her will and he did not blame her. Jackson's last single of the 1990s was "Don't Break My Heart".

After separating from Gordon, Jackson cloistered herself in her home and lived alone for the first time—the first six months she stated she never actually left her house due to being terrified of Gordon seeing her. Weary after her years of public scorn, she didn't know what to do with her life and was afraid to perform again. Jackson struggled to rebuild her confidence but was plagued with self-doubt, explaining, "I got to the point, [...] where—well, you know in the media they say things like, 'Oh, she can't sing. She has no talent. She can't dance.' I started believing that, and I was thinking, 'Oh my God'. And I started thinking, 'Oh gee, how could this happen to me?' How could I start believing this?" After this time she started to perform in Europe and South America occasionally to start making money to pay off the huge debts which Gordon had accumulated in her name while they were married. In the wake of the September 11 attacks Jackson was moved to compose "Free the World". She performed the song for friends to a positive reception. This spurred on Jackson to write more songs, ending up with a full album, Startin' Over.

2003–2006: Re-emergence and return to music
Jackson publicly re-emerged on Larry King Live on March 9, 2003. Her appearance caused CNN's phone lines to stay busy for hours and was King's highest-rated show in three years. Jackson announced her first musical project in six years, Startin' Over. Startin' Over's lead single was 2004's "Just Wanna Dance", released independently under her pseudonymous nickname "Toy" in order to avoid any prejudices DJs might hold against La Toya Jackson's name. The plan worked, with "Just Wanna Dance" reaching #13 on the US Billboard Hot Dance chart. "Free the World" was released later that year to similar success. Jackson's label, Ja-Tail Records secured a deal with Universal Music Group to distribute the album, which was delayed several times due to extenuating circumstances. The 2003 promotional copy of Startin' Over leaked online in 2006; however, Jackson's management revealed that the entire album was being re-recorded with an all-new track list and updated sound. That year Jackson became the spokeswoman for Australian malt beverage Star Ice's US launch.

After Jack Gordon's death in 2005, Jackson was free to speak more openly about the control he had exerted over her life. She sent a security expert to eyewitness that Gordon had not faked his death a second time. In 2005 she appeared on ABC News to recant her previous allegations and defend brother Michael against new charges of child abuse. VH1 described Jackson as a role model having weathered various successes and setbacks.

2007–2009: Reality television

On January 10, 2007, the reality TV show Armed & Famous premiered on CBS starring Jackson and other celebrities. The program documented Jackson's basic training and service as a reserve police officer with the Muncie Police Department. Jackson maintains her badge by continuing to volunteer as a deputy. The show was eventually removed from the CBS lineup, due to its inability to compete with American Idol. VH1 subsequently aired the remaining episodes. On the show, Jackson demonstrated her phobia of cats, after she began hysterically screaming and locked herself in a squad car. This fear, she revealed, was caused by a childhood memory in which a relative was attacked by a cat. She underwent on-screen therapy to try to relieve her of this phobia. A single called "Armed and Famous" was planned but the title was changed to "I Don't Play That" shortly before it was sent to radio stations, where it failed to take off, on January 29, 2007, due to CBS' cancellation of the show.

In January 2009, Jackson was paid £103,000 to appear as a contestant on the of the British television program Celebrity Big Brother 6, which she placed 7th. She was the second member of the Jackson family to be on the show, the first being her brother Jermaine in 2007. She was the fourth person evicted from the house.

The final version of Startin' Over was completed in late 2008, just before Jackson joined the cast of Celebrity Big Brother. A new lead single, "Love, Honor, and Obey", planned for a summer 2009 release, was put on hold because of the death of La Toya's younger brother Michael. Instead, "Home" was released on July 28, 2009 in Michael's memory with all proceeds going to AIDS Project Los Angeles, one of his favorite charities. La Toya Jackson was one of the first siblings present at Reagan-UCLA Medical Center on June 25, 2009, after brother Michael Jackson was pronounced dead after suffering cardiac arrest. She was named as the informant on and signed her brother's death certificate as Conrad Murray refused to sign the death certificate. Jackson requested a second autopsy to be carried out after noting suspicious medical paraphernalia in Michael's rented house, evasive behavior by his doctors, and discovering that $2 million in cash and jewels had gone missing. The Los Angeles County Coroner ruled Jackson's death a homicide weeks later.

2010–present: Reality television and Starting Over

In 2010, Jackson launched Dream Cream, a hand cream for German cosmetics firm Alessandro International, and named Teddy Riley head of Ja-Tail Records' music division. Jackson took part in NBC's Celebrity Apprentice, which aired from March through May 2011 and raised $65,000 for her chosen charity, AIDS Project Los Angeles. La Toya was "fired" from Celebrity Apprentice in episode 8 during season 11, which aired on April 24, 2011 on NBC. In an Apprentice first, Jackson was rehired in the following episode, as she felt she couldn't defend her case. La Toya was fired for the second time on May 8, 2011 and became the first person to be fired from The Apprentice twice within the same season. She was also the first guest judge to appear in two episodes of season three of RuPaul's Drag Race. She also served as guest judge on the 17th season of America's Next Top Model. Jackson's second memoir, Starting Over, was released in the United States on June 21, 2011 through Gallery Books, an imprint of Simon & Schuster. An EP, also called Starting Over, was released the same day via digital outlets.

In 2013, Jackson started her own reality series called Life With La Toya which is premiered on Oprah Winfrey's OWN. Also in 2013, Jackson rejoined the newest cast for The All-Star Celebrity Apprentice. Jackson lasted until the 3rd episode of the season, when she was fired on an episode titled "I'm Being Punked By A Jackson". Jackson volunteered to be the project manager on a task that saw the cast creating a Soap Opera themed commercial for Crystal Light. Jackson's team lost the task and she subsequently was fired by Donald Trump. Unlike her first appearance on the show, Trump specifically stated that he would not allow Jackson to return to the show after being fired. In September 2013, Jackson made her stage debut in a week-long engagement in the off-Broadway musical, Newsical.

It was falsely reported that on December 6, 2013 Jackson married her business partner Jeffre Phillips in Los Angeles.  On December 16 TMZ reported that La Toya and Jeffre stated that they have not married and this was reaffirmed on Oprah: Where Are They Now?. Jeffre had publicly asked her to marry him in an episode of her reality series that recently aired. His decision to propose to La Toya was prompted by their friend Brenda Harvey Richie (ex-wife of Lionel Richie) who noted that they had been best friends for 15 years as he became La Toya's business partner after Jack Gordon. He did so with the permission of La Toya's father, Joe Jackson. Recently it has been reported that La Toya and Jeffre' Phillips have canceled their engagement, but remain close.

Currently, she and Jeffre are also the executive producers of a documentary called "Dancing in Jaffa" which follows 150 young Jewish and Palestinian Israelis as they dance together in unity by putting their cultural differences aside.

In 2016, she collaborated with Iranian-Armenian pop star Andy on the single "Tehran" where she sings in Persian.

On May 24, 2018, she visited El hormiguero to sponsor the musical Forever. The best show about The King of Pop. That same year Jackson participated in a celebrity edition of Food Network's Worst Cooks in America.  Coached by Tyler Florence, she advanced to the final and beat out Ian Ziering to win the season; $25,000 was awarded to Race to Erase MS in Jackson's name.

In February 2019, Jackson was revealed to be "Alien" on the FOX reality series The Masked Singer. In May 2021, two years after she appeared as the Alien on the USA version of The Masked Singer, Jackson competed as the Menina (Girl) on Mask Singer: Adivina Quién Canta (the Spanish version of The Masked Singer), making it the second time she appeared on a version of the singing competition.

Vocal style and influences 

La Toya Jackson has a three-octave vocal range reaching up to E6 in her single, "Bet'cha Gonna Need My Lovin'." The Evening Independent says that she has an "attractive, pleasant voice that is matured and controlled." Andrew Hamilton of AllMusic describes her voice as a light, wispy "sexy whisper". Like her siblings, Michael and Janet, she is mainly a pop, R&B, and dance music performer but she has also dabbled in rock as heard in her song, "No More Drama" and reggae in her signature song "Heart Don't Lie", as well as country music.

Like many other Jacksons, most notably Michael, she cites James Brown as a "major influence". When Jackson headlined the Moulin Rouge she paid homage to La Goulue and cited Josephine Baker as an influence. L'Express hailed Jackson as "the new Josephine Baker." According to academic Bennetta Jules-Rosette, "Through careful planning, she was able to model a successful part of her career abroad on the master tropes of a Baker-like image. Jackson exemplifies Baudrillard's notion that neither the message nor the content count as much as the referentiality of the signifier in postmodern performative discourse."

Discography

Studio albums
 La Toya Jackson (1980)
 My Special Love (1981)
 Heart Don't Lie (1984)
 Imagination (1986)
 La Toya (1988)
 Bad Girl (1990)
 No Relations (1991)
 Formidable (1992)
 From Nashville to You (1994)
 Stop in the Name of Love (1995)

Filmography

Awards and other achievements

 Jackson received a US Congressional Tribute for her participation in a "Beat It" rally and Stay In School Campaign
 Jackson's footprints were immortalized on Rotterdam's Star Boulevard Walk of Fame on December 19, 1991, originally located in Scheveningen.
 She has a namesake dessert at Millions of Milkshakes in West Hollywood. The "La Toya Jackson Shake" consists of strawberries, raspberries, caramel, topped with whipped cream and a Cadbury flake.

References

External links

 Official Facebook Page
 

 
1956 births
Living people
American disco musicians
American house musicians
Singers with a three-octave vocal range
American sopranos
American women pop singers
African-American women singer-songwriters
Dance-pop musicians
American soul singers
Former Jehovah's Witnesses
La Toya Jackson
American LGBT rights activists
Participants in American reality television series
Musicians from Gary, Indiana
Singer-songwriters from California
Writers from Gary, Indiana
20th-century African-American women singers
21st-century African-American women singers
American women memoirists
African-American memoirists
The Apprentice (franchise) contestants
Singer-songwriters from Indiana
Women autobiographers